Route 205 is a New Brunswick local highway that runs for 33.7 kilometres along the Saint John River and Maine border in Madawaska County. The route starts at the International Bridge in Clair (across from Fort Kent, Maine) and ends at English Point on Glasier Lake. The route also serves the communities of Saint-François-de-Madawaska and Connors.

Communities
 Connors
 Saint-François-de-Madawaska
 Clair
 Val Oakes
 Pelletiers Mill

See also
List of New Brunswick provincial highways

References

New Brunswick provincial highways
Roads in Madawaska County, New Brunswick